The 1960–61 season was Colchester United's 19th season in their history and their eleventh season in the third tier of English football, the Third Division. Alongside competing in the Third Division, the club also participated in the FA Cup and the new League Cup competition. Colchester reached the second round in both cups, beating Maidenhead United in the first round of the FA Cup before being eliminated by Aldershot. In the League Cup, Colchester hosted First Division Newcastle United in the first round. They won 4–1, but were knocked out by Southampton in round two.

In the league, Colchester had a very poor season. Seven consecutive defeats left the club languishing in the bottom four by early October 1960, and they remained no higher than one place above the relegation positions for the rest of the season. They were relegated for the first time in their history in 23rd position.

Season overview
After gathering just one point in eleven games, Colchester had hit the bottom of the Third Division by October 1960 and never managed to climb out of the bottom five places. Average attendances plummeted, with a new record–low attendance of 3,141 achieved in the final game of the season against Chesterfield. Despite this, Martyn King managed to score a hat–trick in the game, a 4–3 win for Colchester and finished the season with 25 goals to his name. Colchester had conceded a club record 101 goals in the league.

Aside from Colchester's league woes, they did enjoy some success in the inaugural League Cup competition. They hosted First Division Newcastle United at Layer Road and comprehensively beat them 4–1 in front of a season-best 9,130 crowd. In round two, they were beaten 2–0 at home to Southampton. In the FA Cup, Colchester achieved their best win of the season at home to Maidenhead United in the first round, but were dumped out of the cup by Aldershot in round two.

Players

Transfers

In

 Total spending:  ~ £3,000

Out

Match details

Third Division

Results round by round

League table

Matches

League Cup

FA Cup

Squad statistics

Appearances and goals

|-
!colspan="14"|Players who appeared for Colchester who left during the season

|}

Goalscorers

Clean sheets
Number of games goalkeepers kept a clean sheet.

Player debuts
Players making their first-team Colchester United debut in a fully competitive match.

See also
List of Colchester United F.C. seasons

References

General
Books

Websites

Specific

1960-61
English football clubs 1960–61 season